Leonardo Glacier is a glacier flowing into Wilhelmina Bay between Sadler Point and Café Point, on the west coast of Graham Land, Antarctica. It was charted by the Belgian Antarctic Expedition under Gerlache, 1897–99, and was named by the UK Antarctic Place-Names Committee in 1960 for Leonardo da Vinci, artist, musician, architect and the first aeronautical scientist.

References

Glaciers of Danco Coast